Joachim Lingner (born 1962) is a Swiss molecular biologist. He holds the professorship for life sciences and leads the Lingner Lab at the École Polytechnique Fédérale de Lausanne (EPFL).

Career 
Lingner obtained his PhD from the Biozentrum of the University of Basel in 1992. In 1993 he joined the Howard Hughes Medical Institute at University of Colorado at Boulder for postdoctoral studies under the supervision of Thomas Cech. He then joined Swiss Institute for Experimental Cancer Research (ISREC) in Lausanne, Switzerland, first as a junior group leader in 1997 and became senior group leader in 2002. In 2005 he was appointed as associate professor at EPF Lausanne. Since 2009, Lingner is a full professor at EPF Lausanne.

Research 
The Lingner Lab studies of the structure, function and maintenance of telomeres, the nucleoprotein complexes at the ends of eukaryotic chromosomes that enable chromosome stability and that regulate cellular lifespan. They elucidated how telomere shortening is counteracted by the telomerase enzyme that renders cancer cells immortal. The lab discovered that telomeres are transcribed into telomeric repeat containing RNA (TERRA), which in turn regulates the telomeric chromatin structure and telomere maintenance by telomerase and homology directed repair. Finally, they developed technologies to uncover the changes that occur in the telomeric proteome during aging and disease including cancer.

Awards and recognitions 
Lingner obtained the Friedrich Miescher Prize (2002), was elected as an EMBO member (2005), and received an ERC advanced investigator award (2008), and is a member of the Academia Europaea (2020).

He serves as a member of the scientific advisory board in the Center of Integrative Genomics (CIG) of the University of Lausanne, and has been a member of ERC starting grant review panel.

Selected works 

 Feretzaki M, Pospisilova M, Valador Fernandes R, Lunardi T, Krejci L, Lingner J. Rad51-dependent recruitment of TERRA lncRNA to telomeres through R-loops. Nature, Article, in press.

References

External links 
 Website of the Lingner Lab

Swiss biologists
1962 births
Living people
Members of Academia Europaea
Academic staff of the École Polytechnique Fédérale de Lausanne
University of Basel alumni